Acanthinula aculeata is a species of minute, air-breathing land snail, a terrestrial pulmonate gastropod mollusk or micromollusk in the family Valloniidae.

Description
For terms see gastropod shell.

The 
1.9-2.1 mm. shell is slightly higher than wide and brown in colour. The periostracum bears ribs ( elevated, radial ridges) with characteristic spines. The aperture is circular. The animal is grey on the dorsum and tentacles. The foot and sole margin are white.

Distribution
This species is found in Bulgaria, the Czech Republic, Estonia, Poland, the Netherlands, Slovakia, Great Britain, Ireland, Ukraine and elsewhere.

References

External links
Acanthinula aculeata at Animalbase taxonomy,short description, distribution, biology,status (threats), images 
Acanthinula aculeata   images at Encyclopedia of Life

Valloniidae
Gastropods described in 1774
Taxa named by Otto Friedrich Müller